Diminovula bilineata is a species of sea snail, a marine gastropod mollusk in the family Ovulidae, the ovulids, cowry allies or false cowries.

Description
The length of the shell attains 8.5 mm.

Distribution
This marine species occurs off Madagascar.

References

 Bozzetti L. (2009) Pseudosimnia bilineata (Gastropoda: Ovulidae: Ovulinae) nuova specie dal Madagascar meridionale. Malacologia Mostra Mondiale 64: 17-18
 Lorenz, F. and G. Rosenberg. (2020). A new species of Pseudosimnia from Hawaii (Gastropoda: Ovulidae). Acta Conchyliorum. 19: 77-84.

Ovulidae
Gastropods described in 2009